Revolutionary Socialist Party of Kerala (Bolshevik) is formed as a splinter group from RSP in Kerala in 2001. The party leader at the time of its formation was Baby John, formerly an important RSP leader in Kerala.

RSP(B) joined the UDF, the alliance in Kerala which is led by the INC. The party won 2 seats in the state assembly, Shibu Baby John and Babu Divakaran, in the 2001 election. Babu Divakaran became the Minister of Labour in the state government.

In 2005 RSP(B) left UDF, a decision largely attributed to the party general secretary A. V. Thamarakshan. Babu Divakaran split away and formed the RSP(M). RSP(M) joined in UDF.. RSP(B) merged with JSS in 2009.

Alliance and break-up
RSP(B) had an alliance with BJP in Kerala  since 2014 till 2016 when A.V. Thamarakshan decided to break the alliance and go alone in the 2016 Kerala  assembly elections.

Mass organizations
United Trade Union Congress (B) (UTUC(B))
Revolutionary Youth Front (B) (RYF(B))
All India Progressive Students' Union (B) (AIPSU(B))

See also
Revolutionary Socialist Party 
Kerala Revolutionary Socialist Party (Baby John)
Revolutionary Socialist Party of India (Marxist)
Revolutionary Socialist Party (Leninist)

References

External links
Babu Divakaran
Shibu Baby John

2001 establishments in Kerala
Communist parties in India
Political parties established in 2001
Political parties in Kerala